Sandra Brown (born 1940) is an English former cricketer who played as an all-rounder, and bowled right-arm off break. She appeared in three Test matches for England in 1963, in a series against Australia. She played domestic cricket for Surrey.

References

External links
 
 

1940 births
Living people
People from Sutton, London
England women Test cricketers
Surrey women cricketers